Irregularia is an extant infraclass of sea urchins that first appeared in the Lower Jurassic.

Description and characteristics 
These particular sea urchins are distinguished from other sea urchins by their irregular shape: the anus and often even the mouth are no more at the two poles of the test, creating a bilateral symmetry instead of the classical 5-fold symmetry of echinoderms. The group includes the well known heart urchins, as well as flattened sand dollars, sea biscuits and some other forms. Most of them live inside the sediment, moving in thanks to their particular spines, and feed on its organic fraction.

Taxonomy 

 super-order Atelostomata
 fossil family Acrolusiidae  Mintz, 1968 †
 fossil family Collyritidae  d'Orbigny, 1853 †
 fossil family Disasteridae  Gras, 1848 †
 order Holasteroida
 order Spatangoida
 fossil family Tithoniidae  Mintz, 1968 †
 fossil genus Atlasaster  Lambert, 1931 †
 fossil family Desorellidae  Lambert, 1911a †
 order Echinoneoida
 fossil family Galeropygidae  Lambert, 1911a †
 fossil genus Grasia Michelin, 1854 †
 fossil order Holectypoida †
 fossil family Menopygidae  Lambert, 1911 †
 fossil genus Mesodiadema Neumayr, 1889 †
 super-order Neognathostomata
 familia Apatopygidae  Kier, 1962
 fossil family Archiaciidae  Cotteau & Triger, 1869 †
 order Cassiduloida
 order Clypeasteroida
 fossil family Clypeidae  Lambert, 1898 †
 fossil family Clypeolampadidae  Kier, 1962 †
 order Echinolampadoida
 fossil family Nucleolitidae  L. Agassiz & Desor, 1847 †
 fossil family Pygaulidae  Lambert, 1905 †
 fossil genus Pygolampas Saucède, Dudicourt & Courville, 2012 †
 fossil order Oligopygoida  Kier, 1967 †
 fossil family Pygasteridae  Lambert, 1900 †
 fossil family Pygorhytidae  Lambert, 1909b †

References
 
 

Echinoidea